Tel Sheva or Tel as-Sabi is a Bedouin town in the Southern District of Israel, bordering the city of Beersheba.

History
The first Bedouin township in Israel, Tel as-Sabi was founded in 1967 as part of a government project to settle Bedouins in permanent settlements and became a local council in 1984. It is one of seven Bedouin townships in the Negev desert with approved plans and developed infrastructure.
The Negev Bedouin, a semi-nomadic society, has been going through a process of sedentarization since the later part of Ottoman rule in the region.During the British Mandate period, the administration did not provide a legal frame to justify and preserve land ownership. In order to settle this issue, Israel's land policy was adapted to a large extent from the Ottoman land regulations of 1858 as the only preceding legal frame. Thus Israel nationalized most of the Negev lands using the state's land regulations from 1969.

Israel has continued the policy of sedentarization of the Negev Bedouins first imposed by the Ottoman authorities. Israel's measures at first included regulation and relocation. During the 1950s, Israel relocated two-thirds of the Negev Bedouins into areas administered under martial law. Later on, seven townships were built especially for Bedouins in order to sedentarize and urbanize them by offering better life conditions, proper infrastructure, and high-quality public services, such as sanitation, health, education, and municipal services. The other six townships built during that time are Hura, Lakiya, Ar'arat an-Naqab (Ar'ara BaNegev), Shaqib al-Salam (Segev Shalom), Kuseife (Kseife) and the city of Rahat, the largest among them.

Not all Bedouins agreed to move from tents and structures built on state lands into apartments built specifically for them. About 60% of the Bedouin citizens of Israel live in permanent, planned villages like Tel as-Sabi, while the rest are living in illegal homes spread all over the northern Negev region.

As Tel as-Sabi was the first Bedouin township in Israel, mistakes were made by planners and government officials. The authorities tried to learn from these mistake while planning and building other Bedouin villages and towns by creating, for example, more urban rather than rural environments.

In 2000, the town was ranked lowest (1 out of 10) in socio-economic standing and only 43 percent of twelfth-grade students were eligible to graduate from high school.

Demography
According to the Israel Central Bureau of Statistics (CBS), the population of Tel as-Sabi was 13,000 in December 2005 and 15,700 in December 2010. Tel as-Sabi's jurisdiction measures 5,000 dunams (5 km2).

Economy
Several industrial parks are situated in the area - Ramat Hovav, Hura, but the closest industrial zone to Tel as-Sabi is situated in Beersheba. There are several organizations carrying out different activities aimed at supporting and expanding entrepreneurship in Israel's South in order to further integrate the 160,000 Bedouins living in the Negev into Israel's mainstream economy. They are primarily aimed at Bedouin women.

Twenty Arab-Bedouin women participated in a sewing course for fashion design at the Amal College in Beersheba, including lessons on sewing and cutting, personal empowerment and business initiatives. A number of Bedouin women have undergone professional botanical training and established a business producing a range of unique skin care products based on traditional Bedouin herbal medicine. Their products include cosmetic and dermatological lotions, creams and ointments. Their products are manufactured at the laboratories of Hlavin, an international cosmetics manufacturer and exporter in Ra’anana.

Sports
Hapoel Tel Sheva is a football team based in Tel as-Sabi, which is a member of the Israel Football Association.

See also
Arab localities in Israel
Bedouin In Israel

References

External links
Lands of the Negev, a short film presented by Israel Land Administration describing the challenges faced in providing land management and infrastructure to the Bedouins in Israel's southern Negev region

Arab localities in Israel
Bedouin localities in Israel
Local councils in Southern District (Israel)
Populated places in Southern District (Israel)
Populated places established in 1967
1967 establishments in Israel